The 2016–17 season is the Al-Ittihad Club of Jeddah's 90th in existence and 41st consecutive season in the top flight of Saudi Arabian football. Along with Pro League, the club also competed in the AFC Champions League, Crown Prince Cup and the King Cup.

Players

Squad information

Transfers

In

Out

On loan

Pre-season and friendlies

Competitions

Overall

Last Updated: 28 September 2016

Pro League

League table

Results summary

Results by round

Matches
All times are local, AST (UTC+3).

Crown Prince Cup

All times are local, AST (UTC+3).

King Cup

Statistics

Goalscorers

Last Updated: 28 September 2016

Clean sheets

Last Updated: 31 August 2016

References

Ittihad FC seasons
Ittihad